The Runnin' Kind is a 1989 American comedy film directed by Max Tash and written by Max Tash and Pleasant Gehman. The film stars David Packer, Steven Eckholdt, Larry Cox, Tom Shell, Brie Howard and Richard Manheim. The film was released on September 8, 1989, by United Artists.

Plot
An Ohio teen moves to Los Angeles to find fame as a rock musician and to find a drummer.

Cast 
 David Packer as Joey Curtis
 Steven Eckholdt as Shaun
 Larry Cox as Rudy
 Tom Shell as Carl
 Brie Howard as "Thunder"
 Richard Manheim as Mike Tataglia
 Brenda Lilly as The Receptionist
 Kenneth Tigar as Stan Shank
 John Carter as Richard Curtis
 Keith Mills as Mr. Dickstein
 Susan Strasberg as	Carol Curtis
 Susan Ursitti as Marsha
 Juliette Lewis as Amy Curtis
 Ric Mancini as Mr. Tataglia
 Janaki as Jesse
 Pleasant Gehman as Linda
 Joe Wood as Tyler
 Phil Rubenstein as Burt
 Bernie Bernstein as Mick
 James Cromwell as Uncle Phil
 Julie Cobb as Aunt Barbara
 Rosie Flores as Carla
 Marilyn Reins as Marsky
 Laura Bennett as Chris
 Iris Berry as Girl In Line
 Joey Miyashima as Eddie
 Bobby Nosea as Transvestite
 El Duce as "El Duce"
 John William Young as Steve the Engineer
 Rodney Bingenheimer as Rodney
 Richard Dubin as Detective Watson
 Rob Moran as Jerk In Jeep
 Kenneth Danziger as Frank 
 Mitch Carter as Stagehand 
 Michael David Lally as Michael
 Bobbie Brat as Robin
 Elisa Tash as Martha
 Ben Kronen as Mr. Salzman

References

External links 
 

1989 films
United Artists films
American comedy films
1989 comedy films
1980s English-language films
1980s American films